Liometopum lindgreeni is a species of ant in the genus Liometopum. Described by Forel in 1902, the species is endemic to China and India.

References

Dolichoderinae
Insects described in 1902
Hymenoptera of Asia
Insects of China
Insects of India